Tadepalli Lakshmi Kantha Rao (16 November 1923 – 22 March 2009) was an Indian actor and producer known for his works predominantly in Telugu cinema. Regarded as one of the finest method actors, Rao appeared in more than 400 feature films, starring in many, in a variety of genres including mythological, social and folklore.  He has also acted in a few Hindi, Kannada, Tamil, and Malayalam movies. He has produced about five films under the Hyma Films banner.
In the 1960s, he was one of the primary actors in Telugu cinema, along with N. T. Rama Rao and Akkineni Nageswara Rao. Kantha Rao was known for portraying the roles of Narada, Lord Krishna and Arjuna. He played Lakshmana in the blockbuster film Lava Kusa, for which he received Vishehsa Puraskaram in 1963.

Early life
Rao was born to Kesavarao and Seetaramamma at Kodad of Nalgonda district in present-day Telangana on 16 November 1923. According to the Hindu calendar, it corresponds to Rudhirodgari Samvatsara Kartika Sudha Ashtami day. He lost his father the next year. His primary education was done in Gudibanda and Khammam. He was exposed to puranas and Hindu epic stories from his grandmother.

Career

Surabhi Drama troupe has visited their village. Impressed by their professional performances, he established "Balamitra Natya Mandali" and used to play Gayopakhyanam and Madhuseva plays with his friends. He played the character Brahma in Sri Krishna Leelalu in the group "Surabhi" and subsequently in the plays Madhuseva, Kanakatara and Telugu Talli.

Rao was sent to Tenali to deviate from the drama activities. Tenali used to be very active in drama activities with stalwarts like Pulipati Lakshminarayana. He used to stay in same street where Rentachintala Satyanarayana and Banda Kanakalingeswara Rao used to live.

He then shifted to Madras in 1950 and used stay with T. Krishnamachari, who used to work as assistant director for H. M. Reddy's Rohini Pictures.

H. M. Reddy gave him chance to play a small role in Nirdoshi in 1951 and as his hero for Pratigna in 1953. He has acted in 450 films and in about 100 films as hero, whereas in others as different character roles. They include some popular roles in films like Jayasimha (1955), Shri Krishna Pandaviyam (1966), Guruvunu Minchina Sishyudu (1963), Lava Kusha (1963), Nartanasala (1963), Pandava Vanavasam (1965) and Muthyala Muggu (1975). His last movie was Pandurangadu, with Balakrishna, directed by K. Raghavendra Rao in 2008.

He made four films in between 1969 and 1974, Saptaswaralu, Gandara Gandadu, Premajeevulu and Gundelu Theesina Monagadu and lost all his previous earnings. The last film he made was Swathi Chinukulu. Subsequently, he shifted to Hyderabad.

Awards
National honours
 Visesha Puraskaram in Ramineni Foundation Awards in 2004.
 Mahanati Savitri Award
 C.H. Narayana Rao Award

Nandi Awards
 Raghupathi Venkaiah Award by the government of Andhra Pradesh in 2000, for lifetime achievement.
 Nandi Award for Best Book, for Anaganaga Oka Raakumaarudu won for the year 2007.

Filmography

Actor

Producer
 Saptaswaralu (1969)
 Gandara Gandadu (1969)
 Premajeevulu (1971)
 Gundelu Teesina Monagaadu (1974)
 Swaati Chinukulu (1989)

Personal
Rao was married to Suseela and had a daughter in 1942. The daughter died of smallpox during infancy. They had a son in 1945 named after his father as Keshav. He married Hymavathi in 1950 and subsequently Suseela died of illness. His son also died of typhoid fever in his childhood. He has four sons and a daughter by Hymavathi, named Pratap, Keshav, Suseela, Raja and Satyam, in that order.

His son Raja (Rajeswara Rao) has acted in Sudigundalu, Prema Jeevulu, Gandara Gandadu, Gundelu Teesina Monagadu, Swati Chinukulu, Ukku Pidugu, Rajasimha, Evaru Monagadu, Maro Prapancham and Manushulu Matti Bommalu.

His son Satyam also has acted in Saptaswaralu, Prema Jeevulu and Gandara Gandadu.
His grandson Sai Eshwar also worked as child artist in Television industry.

Death
He died at 9:50 PM IST at Yashoda Hospital, Hyderabad on 22 March 2009 due to cancer complications.

See also
 Raghupathi Venkaiah Award

References

External links
 

1923 births
2009 deaths
Deaths from liver cancer
Deaths from cancer in India
Telugu male actors
Male actors from Telangana
Male actors in Telugu cinema
Indian male film actors
Male actors in Tamil cinema
Male actors in Kannada cinema
Male actors in Hindi cinema
Male actors in Malayalam cinema
Film producers from Telangana
Nandi Award winners
Recipients of the Rashtrapati Award
People from Nalgonda
20th-century Indian male actors
21st-century Indian male actors